Sni Mills is an unincorporated community in Jackson County, in the U.S. state of Missouri.

History
A post office was established at Sni Mills in 1871, and remained in operation until 1902. The community was named after nearby Sni-A-Bar Creek.

References

Unincorporated communities in Jackson County, Missouri
Unincorporated communities in Missouri